Sheikh Bashir Sheikh Yusuf Sheikh Hassan (born c. 1905) was a Somali religious leader famed for leading the 1945 Sheikh Bashir Rebellion against the British colonial authority in Somaliland.

Biography
Sheikh Bashir was born in 1905 in Taleh, British Somaliland. Taleh was known as the Dervish capital and is located in the Sool region of Somaliland. Sheikh Bashir was a nephew of Mohammed Abdullah Hassan and was named by him. He hails from the Yeesif subclan of the Habr Je'lo Isaaq clan. Sheikh Bashir was cultivated at the Markaz (Centre) located in the village of Beer east of Burao and studied there in succession to his father. This Markaz was first established by Sheikh Bashir's grandfather Sheikh Hassan Fiqi Abdi as an educational centre where the Quran, hadith and other Islamic sciences were taught.

According to the Somali historian and novelist Farah Awl the Sayyid had a significant influence on Sheikh Bashir through listening to his poetry and conversations, an influence that impelled him to a "war with the British". After studying in the markaz in Beer he opened a Sufi tariqa (order) sometime in the 1930s, where he preached his ideology of anti-imperialism, stressing the evil of colonial rule and the bringing of radical change through war. His ideology was shaped by a millennial bent, which according to Marxist historian Eric Hobsbawm is the "hope of a complete and radical change in the world shorn of all its present deficiencies".

Sheikh Bashir had been arrested multiple times before the revolt itself had occurred for challenging the authority of the British protectorate. He reached prominence in 1939 when he played a prominent role in a riot in Burao that happened that year as a result of a new educational policy the British authorities had announced, and which it had put an end to after the riots. The British had also at the same time announced a new disarmament policy directed at armed pastoralists. In response, Sheikh Bashir organized a group of some hundred armed tribesmen and dared the British authorities to enforce the policy, which resulted in him being arrested at the end of 1939 and sentenced to a minor term of imprisonment. After his release he returned to his tariqa in Beer, where he continued to preach and encourage his followers to resist all policies of the British authorities. He continued to resist the British authorities through preaching until 1945, when he decided to take arms.

One day, according to a well known story, he challenged sheikhs who were fulminating against the British to actually do something about it. The exchange between Sheikh Bashir and the sheikhs was passed over into history in a poem composed by Yasin Ahmed Haji Nur in January 1980, Muruq Baa Dagaal Gala (Muscle Partakes in War), where he describes the incident:

Sheikh Bashir was also a contemporary of Michael Mariano, a Somali nationalist and businessman who was a Catholic at the time. Once, Sheikh Bashir came to Mariano's home and demanded to know why he was assisting Somalis with their English-language learning in order to prepare for the yearly civil service exam.

Rebellion 

On 2 July, Sheikh Bashir collected 25 of his followers in the town of Wadamago and transported them on a lorry to the vicinity of Burao, where he distributed arms to half of his followers. On the evening of 3 July the group entered Burao and opened fire on the police guard of the central prison in the city, which was filled with prisoners arrested for previous demonstrations. The group also attacked the house of the district commissioner of Burao District, Major Chambers, resulting in the death of Major Chamber's police guard before escaping to Bur Dhab, a strategic mountain south-east of Burao, where Sheikh Bashir's small unit occupied a fort and took up a defensive position in anticipation of a British counterattack.

The British campaign against Sheikh Bashir's troops proved abortive after several defeats as his forces kept moving from place to place and avoiding any permanent location. No sooner had the expedition left the area, than the news traveled fast among the Somali nomads across the plain. The war had exposed the British administration to humiliation. The government came to a conclusion that another expedition against him would be useless; that they must build a railway, make roads and effectively occupy the whole of the protectorate, or else abandon the interior completely. The latter course was decided upon, and during the first months of 1945, the advance posts were withdrawn and the British administration confined to the coast town of Berbera.

Sheikh Bashir settled many disputes among the tribes in the vicinity, which kept them from raiding each other. He was generally thought to settle disputes through the use of Islamic Sharia and gathered around him a strong following.

Erigavo revolt 
Sheikh Bashir sent a message to religious figures in the town of Erigavo and called on them to revolt and join the rebellion he led. The religious leaders as well as the people of Erigavo heeded his call, and mobilized a substantial number of people in Erigavo armed with rifles and spears and staged a revolt. The British authorities responded rapidly and severely, sending reinforcements to the town and opening fire on the armed mobs in two "local actions" as well as arresting minor religious leaders in the town.

Death
The British administration recruited Indian and South African troops, led by police general James David, to fight against Sheikh Bashir and had intelligence plans to capture him alive. The British authorities mobilized a police force, and eventually on 7 July found Sheikh Bashir and his unit in defensive positions behind their fortifications in the mountains of Bur Dhab. After clashes Sheikh Bashir and his second-in-command, Alin Yusuf Ali, nicknamed Qaybdiid, were killed. A third rebel was wounded and was captured along with two other rebels. The rest fled the fortifications and dispersed. On the British side the police general leading the British troops as well as a number of Indian and South African troops perished in the clashes, and a policeman was injured.

After his death, Sheikh Bashir was widely hailed by locals as a martyr and was held in great reverence. His family took quick action to remove his body from the place of his death at Geela-eeg mountain, about 20 miles from Burao.

Legacy 
Sheikh Bashir appears as a significant figure in Somali popular culture, this is seen in references to his life and struggle in Somali poetry, with many poems describing his rebellion and calling on local Somalis to avenge him. In Raqdii Bashiir (The Corpse of Bashir), a poem composed by the famous Habr Yunis poet Haji Adan Ahmed Af-Qallooc in July 1944, he describes the aftermath of Sheikh Bashir's death and the British mistreatment of his body, and called on the people to continue the rebellion, and to avenge Sheikh Bashir and his followers as well as warning them of British settlers taking over the land, something which the British authorities denied and which led to his arrest for attempting to re-ignite the rebellion. In the poem, he said:

Adan Ahmed Af-Qallooc also composed another poem in Sheikh Bashir's honour, titled Gobonimo (Freedom). In it, he said:

Two secondary schools in Hargeisa and Burao, both called the Sheikh Bashir Secondary School, are named in his honour.

References

 A. Ibraham Mohamed (Qorade), A Nation in Tatters: Somalia, 2008

1905 births
Year of death missing
Ethnic Somali people
Somalian Muslims
Somalian religious leaders
Somali nationalists
1945 deaths
Somalian Islamists